Parfums de Marly is a French niche perfume Maison. Its fragrances are inspired by the 18th Century French era and the splendor of the Royal court. Presently, the brand offers over 30 fragrances.

History
Founded in 2009 by Julien Sprecher, he is passionate about history and perfumery since he was young, the name of the brand is inspired by "Château de Marly", residence of King Louis XV. The 18th Century was considered the golden age of perfumery, French King Louis XV, was famed for leading the “perfumed court”. The King was also known for his love of racehorses. The brand logo bears the image of the ‘Chevaux de Marly’ created by Guillaume Coustou and the year of the restoration of the "Château de Marly" in 1743.

Sources
 CP Magazine October 2020.
 Orange June 2019.
 Mills: Worthy of Wanderlust, Mills Pharmacy, 2015.
 Fragrance of the World, 2014 Anniversary Edition.
 The Scented Letter, Issue 25.
 Mercedes Me magazine, January 2018 
 Bloom Winter Romance 
 Fact Qatar September 2020.

References

External links
Website of Parfums de Marly
What Is Burnt Hair Perfume?

Fragrance companies
Chemical companies of France
Companies based in Paris